This page records the details of the Japan national football team in 2004.

General
 The Japan national football team competed in the 2006 FIFA World Cup qualification, won the 2004 Kirin Cup and the 2004 AFC Asian Cup in amongst other friendly matches played.

Schedule

Key
 H = Home match
 A = Away match
 N = Neutral venue

Coach
Zico was the coach for the entire year.

Players statistics

Top goal scorers for 2004

Kits

References

External links
Japan Football Association

Japan national football team results
2004 in Japanese football
Japan